Butte is a consolidated city-county and the county seat of Silver Bow County, Montana, United States. In 1977, the city and county governments consolidated to form the sole entity of Butte-Silver Bow. It is served by Bert Mooney Airport with airport code BTM.

Established in 1864 as a mining camp in the northern Rocky Mountains on the Continental Divide, Butte experienced rapid development in the late-nineteenth century, and was Montana's first major industrial city. In its heyday between the late-nineteenth and early-twentieth centuries, it was one of the largest copper boomtowns in the American West. Employment opportunities in the mines attracted surges of Asian and European immigrants, particularly the Irish; as of 2017, Butte has the largest population of Irish Americans per capita of any city in the United States.

Butte was also the site of various historical events involving its mining industry and active labor unions and socialist politics, the most famous of which was the labor riot of 1914. Despite the dominance of the Anaconda Copper Mining Company, Butte was never a company town. Other major events in the city's history include the 1917 Speculator Mine disaster, the largest hard rock mining disaster in world history.

Over the course of its history, Butte's mining and smelting operations generated in excess of $48 billion worth of ore, but also resulted in numerous environmental implications for the city: The upper Clark Fork River, with headwaters at Butte, is the largest Superfund site in the United States, and the city is also home to the Berkeley Pit. In the late-twentieth century, cleanup efforts from the EPA were instated, and the Butte Citizens Technical Environmental Committee was established in 1984. In the 21st century, efforts at interpreting and preserving Butte's heritage are addressing both the town's historical significance and the continuing importance of mining to its economy and culture. The city's Uptown Historic District, on the National Register of Historic Places, is one of the largest National Historic Landmark Districts in the United States, containing nearly 6,000 contributing properties. The city is also home to Montana Technological University, a public engineering and technical university.

History

Early history and immigrants
Prior to Butte's formal establishment in 1864, the area consisted of a mining camp that had developed in the early 1860s. The city is located in the Silver Bow Creek Valley (or Summit Valley), a natural bowl sitting high in the Rockies straddling the Continental Divide, positioned on the southwestern side of a large mass of granite known as the Boulder Batholith, which dates to the Cretaceous era. In 1874, William L. Farlin founded the Asteroid Mine (subsequently known as the Travona); Farlin's founding of the Asteroid Mine attracted a significant number of prospectors seeking gold and silver. The mines attracted workers from Cornwall (England), Ireland, Wales, Lebanon, Canada, Finland, Austria, Italy, China, Montenegro, Mexico, and more. In the ethnic neighborhoods, young men formed gangs to protect their territory and socialize into adult life, including the Irish of Dublin Gulch, the Eastern Europeans of the McQueen Addition, and the Italians of Meaderville.

Among the migrants were many Chinese who set up businesses that created a Chinatown in Butte. The Chinese migrations stopped in 1882 with the passage of the Chinese Exclusion Act. There was anti-Chinese sentiment in the 1870s and onwards due to racism on the part of the white settlers, exacerbated by economic depression, and in 1895, the chamber of commerce and labor unions started a boycott of Chinese owned businesses. The business owners fought back by suing the unions and winning. The history of the Chinese migrants in Butte is documented in the Mai Wah Museum.

The influx of miners gave Butte a reputation as a wide-open town where any vice was obtainable. The city's saloon and red-light district, called the "Line" or "The Copper Block", was centered on Mercury Street, where the elegant bordellos included the famous Dumas Brothel. Behind the brothel was the equally famous Venus Alley, where women plied their trade in small cubicles called "cribs." The red-light district brought miners and other men from all over the region and remained open until 1982 after the closure of the Dumas Brothel; the city's red-light was one of the last such urban districts in the United States. Commercial breweries first opened in Butte in the 1870s, and were a large staple of the city's early economy; they were usually run by German immigrants, including Leopold Schmidt, Henry Mueller, and Henry Muntzer. The breweries were always staffed by union workers. Most ethnic groups in Butte, from Germans and Irish to Italians and various Eastern Europeans, including children, enjoyed the locally brewed lagers, bocks, and other types of beer.

Industrial expansion

In the late 19th century, copper was in great demand because of new technologies such as electric power that required the use of copper. Three industrial magnates fought for control of Butte's mining wealth. These three "Copper Kings" were William A. Clark, Marcus Daly, and F. Augustus Heinze.
The Anaconda Copper Mining Company began in 1881 when Marcus Daly bought a small mine named the Anaconda.  He was a part-owner, mine manager and engineer of the Alice, a silver mine in Walkerville, a suburb of Butte. While working in the Alice, he noticed significant quantities of high grade copper ore. Daly obtained permission to inspect nearby workings. After Daly's employers, the Walker Brothers, refused to buy the Anaconda, Daly sold his interest in the Alice and bought it himself. Daly asked George Hearst, San Francisco mining magnate, for additional support. Hearst agreed to buy one-fourth of the new company's stock without visiting the site. While mining the silver left in his mine, huge deposits of copper were soon developed and Daly became a copper magnate. When surrounding silver mines "played out" and closed, Daly quietly bought up the neighboring mines, forming a mining company. Daly built a smelter at Anaconda, Montana (a company town) and connected his smelter to Butte by a railway. Anaconda Company eventually owned all the mines on Butte Hill.

Between 1884 and 1888, W.A. Clark constructed the Copper King Mansion in Butte, which became his second residence from his home in New York City. He also, in 1899, purchased the Columbia Gardens, a small park which he developed into a full amusement park, featuring a pavilion, rollercoaster, and a lake for swimming and canoeing. Clark's expansion of the park was intended to "provide a place where children and families could get away from the polluted air of the Butte mining industry." The city's rapid expansion was noted in an 1889 frontier survey: "Butte, Montana, fifteen years ago a small placer-mining village clinging to the mountain side, has now risen to the rank of the first mining camp of the world... [It] is now the most populous city of Montana, numbering twenty-five thousand active, enterprising, prosperous inhabitants." In 1888 alone, mining operations in Butte had generated an "almost inconceivable" output of $23 million worth of ore.

Copper ore mined from the Butte mining district in 1910 alone totaled ; at the time, Butte was the largest producer of copper in North America and rivaled in worldwide metal production only by South Africa. The amount of ore produced in the city earned it the nickname "The Richest Hill on Earth." With its large workforce of miners performing in physically dangerous conditions, Butte was the site of active labor union movements, and came to be known as "the Gibraltar of Unionism."

By 1885, there were about 1,800 dues-paying members of a general union in Butte. That year the union reorganized as the Butte Miners' Union (BMU), spinning off all non-miners to separate craft unions. Some of these joined the Knights of Labor, and by 1886 the separate organizations came together to form the Silver Bow Trades and Labor Assembly, with 34 separate unions representing nearly all of the 6,000 workers around Butte. The BMU established branch unions in mining towns like Barker, Castle, Champion, Granite, and Neihart, and extended support to other mining camps hundreds of miles away. In 1892 there was a violent strike in Coeur d'Alene. Although the BMU was experiencing relatively friendly relations with local management, the events in Idaho were disturbing. The BMU not only sent thousands of dollars to support the Idaho miners, they mortgaged their buildings to send more.

There was a growing concern that local unions were vulnerable to the power of Mine Owners' Associations like the one in Coeur d'Alene. In May 1893, about forty delegates from northern hard-rock mining camps met in Butte and established the Western Federation of Miners (WFM), which sought to organize miners throughout the West. The Butte Miners' Union became Local Number One of the new WFM. The WFM won a strike in Cripple Creek, Colorado, the following year, but then in 1896–1897 lost another violent strike in Leadville, Colorado, prompting the Montana State Trades and Labor Council to issue a proclamation to organize a new Western labor federation along industrial lines.

Anaconda Copper and civil unrest

In 1899, Daly joined with William Rockefeller, Henry H. Rogers, and Thomas W. Lawson to organize the Amalgamated Copper Mining Company. Not long after, the company changed its name to Anaconda Copper Mining Company (ACM). Over the years, Anaconda was owned by assorted larger corporations. In the 1920s, it had a virtual monopoly over the mines in and around Butte. Between approximately 1900 and 1917, Butte also had a strong streak of Socialist politics, even electing Mayor Lewis Duncan on the Socialist ticket in 1911, and again in 1913; Duncan was impeached in 1914 for neglecting duties after a bombing in the city's miners' hall in 1914.

It had also established itself as "one of the most solid union cities in America." After 1905, Butte became a hotbed of Industrial Workers of the World (IWW, or the "Wobblies") organizing. Rivalry between IWW supporters and the WFM locals culminated in the Butte, Montana labor riots of 1914, and resulted in the loss of union recognition by the mine owners. After the dissolution of the Miners' Union, the Anaconda Company attempted to inaugurate programs aimed at enticing employees. However, a number of clashes between laborers, labor organizers, and the Anaconda Company ensued, including the 1917 lynching of IWW executive board officer Frank Little. In 1920, company mine guards gunned down strikers in the Anaconda Road Massacre. Seventeen were shot in the back as they tried to flee, and one man died.

A rescue effort commenced, but carbon monoxide was contaminating the air supply. Several men barricaded themselves against bulkheads to save their lives, but many others died in a panic to try to escape. Rescue workers set up a fan to prevent the fire from spreading. This worked for a short time, but when the rescuers tried to use water, the water evaporated, creating steam that burned those trying to escape. Once the fire had been extinguished, recovery of the deceased began; many of the bodies, however, were mutilated beyond recognition, leaving many unidentified. The disaster claimed a total of 168 lives. As of 2017, the event remained the largest hard rock mining accident in history. The Granite Mountain Memorial in Butte commemorates those who died in the accident.

Protests and strikes were initiated after the Speculator Mine disaster, as well as the establishment of the Metal Mine Workers Union; approximately 15,000 workers abandoned their jobs in the wake of the disaster. Between 1914 and 1920, the U.S. National Guard occupied Butte a total of six times to restore civility. In 1917, copper production from the Butte mines peaked and steadily declined thereafter. By WWII, copper production from the ACM's holdings in Chuquicamata, Chile, far exceeded Butte's production.

In 1919, women's rights activist Margaret Jane Steele Rozsa became a food inspector for the city, and immediately began pressing for change to questionable practices by several county commissioners who had been keeping the community's cost of living artificially high by, among other things, allowing carloads of perishable foods to rot on unloaded trains at the railroad station. She also "was instrumental in getting senate bill No. 19 through the legislature," that year to ensure that 199 tubercular soldiers who had served in World War I would be given "preference of entry to the Galen hospital," and that the legislature would authorize $20,000 in state funds to build additional dormitories at the hospital to make that care possible since hospital admissions were already at capacity. In 1921, she became the first female prohibition inspector in the city.

Open-pit mining era

Disputes between miners' unions and companies continued through the 1920s and 1930s in Butte, with several strikes and protests, one of which lasted for ten months in 1921. On New Year's Eve 1922, protestors attempted to detonate the Hibernian Hall on Main Street with dynamite.

Further industrial expansions included the arrival of the first mail plane in the city in 1928, and in 1937, the city's streetcar system was dismantled and replaced with bus lines. After the 1920s, the ACM began to reduce its activities in Butte due to the labor-intensivity of underground mining, as well as competition from other mine holdings in South America. This ultimately led the Anaconda Company to switch its focus in Butte from underground mining to open pit mining.

Since the 1950s, five major developments in the city have occurred: the Anaconda's decision to begin open-pit mining in the mid-1950s, a series of fires in Butte's business district in the 1970s, a debate over whether to relocate the city's historic business district, a new civic leadership, and the end of copper mining in 1983. In response, Butte looked for ways to diversify the economy and provide employment. The legacy of over a century of environmental degradation has, for example, produced some jobs. Environmental cleanup in Butte, designated a Superfund site, has employed hundreds of people.

Thousands of homes were destroyed in the Meaderville suburb and surrounding areas, McQueen and East Butte, to excavate the Berkeley Pit, which opened in 1954 by Anaconda Copper. At the time of its opening, the Berkeley Pit was the largest truck-operated open pit copper mine in the United States. The Berkeley Pit grew with time until it began encroaching on the Columbia Gardens. After the Gardens caught fire and burned to the ground in November 1973, the Continental Pit was excavated on the former park site. In 1977, the ARCO (Atlantic Richfield Company) company purchased Anaconda, and only three years later started shutting down mines due to lower metal prices. In 1983, all mining in the Berkeley Pit was suspended. The same year, an organization of low income and unemployed residents of Butte formed to fight for jobs and environmental justice; the Butte Community Union produced a detailed plan for community revitalization and won substantial benefits, including a Montana Supreme Court victory striking down as unconstitutional State elimination of welfare benefits. After mining ceased at the Berkeley Pit, water pumps in nearby mines were also shut down, which resulted in highly acidic water laced with toxic heavy metals filling up the pit.

Anaconda ceased mining at the Continental Pit in 1983. Montana Resources LLP bought the property and reopened the Continental Pit in 1986. The company ceased mining in 2000, but resumed in the fall of 2003.

21st century 

Fourteen headframes still remain over mine shafts in Butte, and the city still contains thousands of historic commercial and residential buildings from the boom times, which, especially in the Uptown section, give it an old-fashioned appearance, with many commercial buildings not fully occupied; according to a 2016 estimate, there were "hundreds" of unoccupied buildings in Butte, resulting in the city introducing an ordinance to keep record of owners. Preservation efforts of the city's historic buildings began in the late 1990s. As with many industrial cities, tourism and services, especially health care (Butte's St. James Hospital has Southwest Montana's only major trauma center), are rising as primary employers, as well as industrial-sector private companies. Many areas of the city, especially the areas near the old mines, show signs of urban blight but a recent influx of investors and an aggressive campaign to remedy blight has led to a renewed interest in restoring property in Uptown Butte's historic district, which was expanded in 2006 to include parts of Anaconda and is one of the largest National Historic Landmark Districts in the United States with 5,991 contributing properties.

A century after the era of intensive mining and smelting, environmental issues remain in areas around the city. Arsenic and heavy metals such as lead are found in high concentrations in some spots affected by old mining, and for a period of time in the 1990s the tap water was unsafe to drink due to poor filtration and decades-old wooden supply pipes. Efforts to improve the water supply have taken place in the past few years, with millions of dollars being invested to upgrade water lines and repair infrastructure. Environmental research and clean-up efforts have contributed to the diversification of the local economy, and signs of vitality, including the introduction of a multimillion-dollar polysilicon manufacturing plant nearby in the 1990s. In the late 1990s, Butte was recognized as an All-America City and as one of the National Trust for Historic Preservation's Dozen Distinctive Destinations in 2002.

Geography
The city is situated on the U.S. Continental Divide. Every highway exiting Butte (except westbound I-90) crosses the Divide (eastbound I-90 via Homestake Pass; eastbound MT 2 via Pipestone Pass; northbound I-15 via Elk Park Pass and southbound I-15 via Deer Lodge Pass).

The city was named for a nearby landform, Big Butte, by the early miners. Butte's urban landscape is notable for including mining operations set within residential areas, visible in the form of various headframes throughout the city.

Cityscapes

Neighborhoods

The concentration of wealth in Butte due to its mining history resulted in unique and ornate architectural features amongst its homes and buildings, particularly throughout the uptown section of Butte. Uptown, named after its steep streets, is located on a hillside on the northwestern edge of the town and is characterized by its abundance of lavish Victorian homes and Queen Anne style cottages built in the late-nineteenth century. Several of Butte's "painted ladies"-homes were featured in the 1987 book Daughters of Painted Ladies by Elizabeth Pomada. Butte-Silver Bow County has an established Urban Revitalization Agency which works to improve building façades to "enhance and promote the architectural resources of historic uptown Butte." In 2017, a television pilot titled Butteification aired on HGTV, which focused on a couple restoring a Victorian home in Butte.

Butte's South district, situated at a lower elevation below the hillside that comprises northern Butte, has historically been home to working-class neighborhoods. Gold mines originally populated south Butte before it was platted for the Union Pacific Railroad in 1881.

The expansion of the Anaconda Company in the 1960s and 1970s eradicated some of Butte's historic neighborhoods, including the East Side, Dublin Gulch, Meaderville, and Chinatown. The St. Mary's section of Butte, which borders uptown to the east, comprised the Dublin Gulch (an enclave for Irish immigrants) and Corktown neighborhoods. It takes its name from the eponymous Roman Catholic parish located within it, which was historically known as the "miner's church," scheduling masses around miners' shifting schedules. Historically, the St. Mary's section of Butte had a prominent population of Slavic and Finnish immigrants in addition to Irish prior to the mid-twentieth century.

Climate
Butte has a cold semi-arid climate (BSk) under the Köppen Climate Classification. Summers are short, with very warm days and chilly nights: July averages . Snowfall is somewhat limited by dryness: the most in one month being  in May 1927 and the greatest depth on the ground  on December 28 and 29, 1996.

Demographics

As of the 2020 census, there were 34,494 people and 14,605 households residing in Butte-Silver Bow, giving a population density of 48.2 people per square mile (18.6/km2). Per the US Census' 2019 American Community Survey, the racial makeup of the city was 94.3% White, 0.6% African American, 2.3% Native American, 0.8% Asian, 0.0% Pacific Islander, and 1.9% from two or more races. Hispanic or Latino of any race accounted for 4.6% of the population. Of ethnic groups in Butte, the Irish make up a significant portion, with over one-quarter of the city's population claiming Irish descent, exceeding the percentage of Irish Americans in Boston. Per capita, Butte has the highest percentage of Irish Americans of any city in the United States.

Per the 2019 American Community Survey, the average household size was 2.24 persons, 6.0% of the population is under the age of 5, 20.1% under the age of 18, and 18.7% are 65 years of age or older. 49.3% of residents were female. From 2015–2019, the median income for a household in the city was $45,797, and 17.3% of families were below the poverty line.

While some sources state that Butte had a peak population of nearly 100,000 around 1920, there is no documentation to corroborate this, though it has been reasoned by local journalists based on city directory data. The city's population sank continually to a minimum around 1990 and has stabilized since then; the apparent jump in the 1980 census was due to the city's consolidation with all of Silver Bow County except Walkerville.

Economy
As a mining boomtown, Butte's economy has historically been powered by its copious mining operations which were economical driving forces from the late-nineteenth century into the late-twentieth century. Silver and gold were initially the primary metals mined in Butte, but the abundance of copper in the area would further invigorate the local economy with the advent of electricity, which created a soaring demand for the metal. After World War I, Butte's mining economy experienced a downward trend that continued throughout the twentieth century, until mining operations ceased in 1985 with the closure of the Berkeley Pit. Over the course of its history, the city's mining operations generated over $48 billion worth of ore, making it for a time the richest city in the world.

Much of the city's economy post-millennium has been focused in energy companies (such as the Renewable Energy Corporation and NorthWestern Energy) and healthcare. In 2014, NorthWestern Energy constructed a $25-million facility in uptown Butte.

Government

Local government 
In 1977, Butte consolidated with Silver Bow County, becoming a consolidated city-county. It operates under a city-county government. The office of the mayor was eliminated. Mario Micone was the last mayor of Butte. In 1977, Micone became the first Chief Executive of Butte-Silver Bow County.

Politics 
Politically, Butte has historically been a Democratic stronghold, owing to its union legacy. Likewise, Silver Bow County has historically been one of the strongest Democratic bastions in Montana. In 1996, Haley Beaudry became the first Republican to represent Butte in the state legislature since 1950. In 2010, Max Yates was the next Butte Republican elected to the legislature; however, neither Beaudry or Yates were re-elected. In 2014, Butte became the third city in Montana to pass an anti-discrimination ordinance protecting LGBT residents and visitors from discrimination in employment, housing and public accommodations.

Culture

Historical sites and museums

Butte is home to numerous museums and other educational institutions chronicling the city's history. In 2002, Butte was one of only twelve towns in America to be named a Distinctive Destination by the National Trust for Historic Preservation. The Butte Silver Bow Public Library, located at 226 W. Broadway in uptown Butte (BSB Library has two branches, one in the mall (South Branch), and is dedicated to preserving the town's history. The Butte library was created in 1894 as "an antidote to the miners' proclivity for drinking, whoring, and gambling," designed to promote middle-class values and to promote an image of Butte as a cultivated city. Additionally, the Butte-Silver Bow Public Archives stores and provides public access to documents and artifacts from Butte's past.

Several museums and attractions are dedicated to the city's mining history, including the MBMG Mineral Museum (located on the Montana Tech campus), and the World Museum of Mining located at the Orphan Girl mine in uptown Butte, which features "Hell Roarin' Gulch," a mockup of a frontier mining town. The Berkeley Pit, a gigantic former open pit copper mine, is also open to the public for viewing. Other museums are dedicated to preserving cultural elements of Butte: The Dumas Brothel museum, a former brothel, is located in Venus Alley, Butte's former historical red-light district. Another notable site is the Rookwood Speakeasy, a prohibition-era speakeasy which features an underground city, and the Mai Wah Museum, dedicated to preserving Asian heritage in the Rocky Mountains.

The 34-room Copper King Mansion in uptown Butte was constructed in 1884 by William A. Clark, one of the city's three Copper Kings. The mansion functions as a bed-and-breakfast and local museum, and is often reported to be a haunted site. The Art Chateau, at one time home to Clark's son, Charles, was designed in the image of a French château, and contemporarily houses the Butte-Silver Bow Arts Foundation.

Located above Butte on the northeast edge of the city is the Our Lady of the Rockies statue, a  statue of the Blessed Virgin Mary, dedicated to women and mothers everywhere, situated on top of the Continental Divide. The statue was air-liftedto the site on December 17, 1985, after six years of construction. Butte is also home to the U.S. High Altitude Speed Skating Center, an outdoor speed-skating rink used as a training location for World Cup skaters.

Throughout uptown and western Butte are over ten underground mine headframes that are remnants from the town's mining industry. These include the Anselmo, the Steward, the Original, the Travona, the Belmont, the Kelly, the Mountain Con, the Lexington, the Bell/Diamond, the Granite Mountain, and the Badger. As part of a community project started around 2004, several headframes were repainted and outlined with LED lights which are illuminated at night.

Events and traditions

Butte's longstanding Irish Catholic community (which is the highest per capita of any city in the United States) has been celebrated annually on St. Patrick's Day since 1882. Each year, about 30,000 revelers converge on Butte's historic Uptown district to enjoy the parade led by the Ancient Order of Hibernians.

A larger annual celebration is Evel Knievel Days, held on the last weekend of July, celebrating Evel Knievel (a Butte native). The weekend-long event, held in Uptown Butte, features various stunt performances, sporting competitions, fundraisers, and live music.

Butte is perhaps becoming most renowned for the regional Montana Folk Festival held on the second weekend in July. This event began its run in Butte as the National Folk Festival from 2008 to 2010 and in 2011 made the transition to a free-of-admission music festival. Also held in the summer is Butte's Fourth of July Parade and Fireworks show. In 2008, Barack Obama spent his last Fourth of July before his Presidency campaigning in Butte, taking in the parade with his family, and celebrating his daughter Malia Obama's 10th birthday.

The legacy of the immigrants in Butte lives on in the form of various local cuisine, including the Cornish pasty which was popularized by mine workers who needed something easy to eat in the mines, the povitica—a Slavic nut bread pastry which is a holiday favorite sold in many supermarkets and bakeries in Butte—and the boneless porkchop sandwich. The Pekin Noodle Parlor in Uptown is the oldest family-owned, continuously operating Chinese restaurant in the US.

Environmental concerns

Berkeley Pit

After the closure of the Berkeley Pit mining operations in 1982, pipes which pumped groundwater out of the pit were turned off, resulting in the pit slowly filling with groundwater, creating an artificial lake. Only two years later the pit was classified as a Superfund site and an environmental hazard site. The water in the pit is contaminated with various hard metals, such as arsenic, cadmium, and zinc.

It was not until the 1990s that serious efforts to clean up the Berkeley Pit began. The situation gained even more attention after as many as 342 migrating geese chose the pit lake as a resting place, resulting in their deaths. Steps have since been taken to prevent a recurrence, including but not limited to loudspeakers broadcasting sounds to scare off waterfowl. However, in November 2003 the Horseshoe Bend treatment facility went online and began treating and diverting much of the water that would have flowed into the pit. The Berkeley Pit is both a Superfund site and tourist attraction, viewable from an observation deck. Per a 2014 report, scientists believe the Berkeley Pit may reach the critical water level—potentially contaminating Silver Bow Creek—by the year 2023. Nikia Greene, EPA project manager for mine flooding, assured in 2014: "The pit is a giant bathtub. There's a hydraulic gradient into the pit. We will never let the water reach the critical level."

Upper Clark Fork River
The Upper Clark Fork River, with Butte at the headwaters, is America's largest Superfund site, spanning . This area takes in the cities of Butte, Anaconda, and Missoula. The mining and smelting activity in Butte resulted in significant contamination of the Butte Hill as well as downstream and downwind areas. The contaminated land extends along a corridor of  that reaches to Milltown near Missoula and takes in adjacent areas such as the Anaconda smelter site. Contaminated sediment flooded out from abandoned mines was the root cause of the pollution at the headwaters of the Clark Fork River.

Between the upstream city of Butte and the downstream city of Missoula lies the Deer Lodge Valley. By the 1970s, local citizens and agency personnel were increasingly concerned over the toxic effects of arsenic and heavy metals on environment and human health. The Anaconda Copper Mining Corporation (ACM), which merged with the Atlantic Richfield Corporation (ARCO) in 1977, is considered one of the responsible parties in this contamination. Shortly thereafter, in 1983, ARCO ceased mining and smelting operations in the Butte-Anaconda area.

For more than a century, the Anaconda Copper Mining company mined ore from Butte and smelted it in Butte (prior to  1920) and in nearby Anaconda. In Butte, mine tailings were dumped directly into Silver Bow Creek, creating a  plume of pollution extending down the valley to Milltown Dam on the Clark Fork River just upstream of Missoula. Air and water borne pollution poisoned livestock and agricultural soils throughout the Deer Lodge Valley. Modern environmental clean-up efforts have continued into the twenty-first century.

Sports
Playing for the Pioneer Baseball League, the Butte Copper Kings were first active from 1979–1985, then 1987–2000; as of 2018, the team is known as the Grand Junction Rockies.

Hockey teams from Butte have included the Butte Irish (America West Hockey League) active from 1996 to 2002, after which they became the Wichita Falls Wildcats; and the Butte Roughriders (Northern Pacific Hockey League), active from 2003 to 2011. The Butte Cobras, a Western States Hockey League team, was active from 2014 to 2017. The Cobras then bought the Glacier Nationals franchise in the North American 3 Hockey League (NA3HL) for the 2017–18 season, but the team went dormant prior to playing the season. They eventually began playing in the NA3HL for the 2018–19 season.

The Butte Daredevils (Continental Basketball Association), active from 2006 to 2008, were named for Butte native Evel Knievel.

University teams include the Montana Tech Orediggers, who have competed in the Frontier Conference of the NAIA since the league's founding in 1952. The school hosts men's and women's basketball, football, golf, and women's volleyball.

In October 2020, Butte was awarded a team in the Expedition League to begin play in May 2021.

Transportation
The city is served by the Butte Bus system, which operates within Butte as well as to the Montana Tech campus and nearby Walkerville. Intercity bus service is provided by Jefferson Lines and Salt Lake Express. Bert Mooney Airport has commercial flights on Delta Connection Airlines and Horizon Air.

Butte can be accessed via Interstate 15 from north–south, and Interstate 90 from east–west; the two intersect in Butte, making Butte and Billings the only cities in Montana situated at a juncture of two interstate highways.  The city can also be accessed from the south via Montana Highway 2 (Old U.S. Route 10).

The Union Pacific Railroad until 1971 ran the Butte Special from Butte, south to Idaho Falls, then to Salt Lake City. Until 1979 Butte was served by Amtrak's Chicago – Seattle North Coast Hiawatha train.

Education

Public education is provided by Butte Public Schools. Butte High School enrolls around 1,300 students. In correspondence with the Butte Public Schools system, the Butte Education Foundation was established in 2006, which aims to revitalize the public schools in an effort to attract new businesses and residents. In the foundation's mission statement, it is noted that there is a "need to demonstrate a genuine and ongoing commitment to public education. Schools are often the first thing visitors ask about when looking at Butte as a potential new home."

There are several private schools in Butte: The Butte Central Catholic High School operates under the Diocese of Helena, which also operates Butte Central Elementary, a Catholic elementary school. Other private elementary schools include the Silver Bow Montessori School.

The first institute of higher education in Butte was the Montana School of Mines, which was established in 1889, the year of Montana's statehood. The university changed its name to Montana Tech in the mid-twentieth century, and in 1994 became affiliated with the University of Montana. The university specializes in engineering as well as geologic and hydrogeologic research. It was ranked no. 4 by the U.S. News & World Report in 2017 for "Best Regional Colleges in the West." Montana Tech of the University of Montana officially changed its name to Montana Technological University in 2018. Montana Technological University is also home to Highlands College, a two-year-college that grants associate's and trade degrees.

Media

Radio and television
Major AM stations in Butte are KBOW AM 550 (country), KANA 580 (oldies), and KXTL 1370 (oldies and talk radio). FM stations include KAPC 91.3 Montana Public Radio (via the University of Montana); KAAR 92.5 (country); KOPR 94.1 (classic rock), KMBR 95.5 (mainstream rock), KQRV 96.9 (country), KGLM 97.7 (contemporary), KMSM-FM 103.9 (variety), and KBMF 102.5 community radio (classical; via Montana State University).

Butte shares its Neilsen market with nearby Bozeman, with which it forms the 194th largest TV market in the United States. Local television stations include: KXLF (Channel 4), a CBS/CW affiliate, and the oldest broadcast television station in the state of Montana; KTVM (Channel 6), an NBC affiliate with additional programming from nearby KECI-TV in Missoula; KUSM (Channel 9), a PBS affiliate broadcasting out of Montana State University in Bozeman; and KWYB (Channel 19), an ABC/FOX affiliate and last of the "Big Three" networks to come into the market (1992). Prior to this Butte's ABC feeds came from KUSA-TV in Denver, Colorado and FOX from now-defunct Butte station KBTZ.

Newspapers
Butte has one local daily, a weekly paper, as well as several papers from around the state of Montana. The Montana Standard is Butte's daily paper. It was founded in 1928 and is the result of The Butte Miner and the Anaconda Standard merging into one daily paper. The Standard is owned by Lee Enterprises. The Butte Weekly is another local paper.

In popular culture

Film and television
Butte has appeared in numerous films. The first film to notably feature Butte was Evel Knievel (1971), a biopic of Evel Knievel, a Butte native. The 1976 thriller The Killer Inside Me, starring Stacy Keach and Susan Tyrrell and set in small-town Montana, was also partially shot in Butte in September 1974. The city was featured in Runaway Train (1985), shot in part on the Butte, Anaconda and Pacific Railway, and the miniseries Return to Lonesome Dove (1993). Other films shot in Butte include F.T.W. (1994).

The animated film Beavis and Butt-head Do America (1996) depicts Butte. In 2004, the Wim Wenders film Don't Come Knocking was set and shot in Butte. In 2015, the SyFy-produced horror film Dead 7, which starred Nick Carter and AJ McLean of the Backstreet Boys, as well as Joey Fatone of 'NSync, was shot at the city's Anselmo Mine yards. The 2019 film Juanita is set in Butte.

The city has been subject of several documentary films, including Die Vergessene Stadt: Butte, Montana (1992), a German documentary by Thomas Schadt, and Butte, America (2008), narrated by Gabriel Byrne.

Literary depictions
One of the earliest literary depictions of Butte was by Mary MacLane, a diarist who wrote of her life growing up in the town at the turn of the twentieth century. Her diaries are published under the title I Await the Devil's Coming, and have been credited as a progenitor of confessional writing. Butte answers to the unflattering description of the fictional city of Poisonville in Dashiell Hammett's novel Red Harvest,  which also alludes to the 1920 Anaconda Road Massacre. The 1980 novel The Butte Polka by Donald McCaig also incorporates the city's mining history into its plot, featuring a character who goes missing from his post at a Butte copper mine.

More contemporary literary depictions of Butte can be found in 1998's Buster Midnight's Cafe by Sandra Dallas, as well as the historical fiction novel Go By Go by Jon A. Jackson, which depicts the 1917 Speculator Mine disaster. Ivan Doig's 2010 novel Work Song and his 2013 novel Sweet Thunder are set in Butte in 1919 and 1920 respectively, after World War I. Confessions of a Shanty Irishman by Michael Corrigan has a chapter-story set in Butte during the Speculator mining disaster and riots. 

Novelist Marian Jensen also has published a mystery series named Mining City Mysteries, which is set in Butte and the surrounding region.

Notable people

Sister cities
 Altensteig, Baden-Württemberg, Germany 
Bytom, Silesian Voivodeship, Poland

See also

 List of municipalities in Montana
 Anaconda Copper Mine (Montana)
 Irish language outside Ireland
 Melrose, Montana
 Rocker, Montana
 Silver Bow, Montana
 St. John's Episcopal Church
 List of Superfund sites in Montana

Notes

References

Works cited

Further reading

Pollution and toxic cleanup
Bibliographic materials

 Barnett, Harold C. Toxic Debts and the Superfund Dilemma (University of North Carolina Press, 1994)
 Barry, Bridget R. "Toxic Tourism: Promoting the Berkeley Pit and Industrial Heritage in Butte, Montana." (2012). online
 Bookspan, Shelley. "Junk It, or Junket?" Public Historian (2001) 23#2 pp. 5–8 in JSTOR
 Capek, Stella M. 1992. Environmental Justice, Regulation, and the Local Community." International Journal of Health Services 22(4):729–746.
 Chess, C. and Purcell, K. 1999. Public participation and the environment: Do we know what works? Environmental Science and Technology 33(16): 2685–2692.
 Church, Thomas W. and Robert T. Nakamura. 1993. Cleaning up the Mess: Implementation Strategies in Superfund (Washington: The Brookings Institution).
 Covello VT and Mumpower J. 1985 "Risk Analysis and Risk Management: A Historical Perspective," Risk Analysis 5(2): 103–120.
 Dobb, Edwin. 1999. "Mining the Past." High Country News 31 (11): 1–10.
 Dobb, Edwin. 1996. "Pennies from Hell: In Montana, the Bill for America's Copper Comes Due." Harper's Magazine (293): 39–54.
 Langewiesche, William. 2001. "The Profits of Doom—One of the Most Polluted Cities in America Learns to Capitalize on Its Contamination" The Atlantic Monthly (April 2001): 56–62.
 Levine, Mark. 1996. "As the Snake Did Away with the Geese." Outside Magazine 21 (September 1996): 74–84.
 Edelstein, Michael R. 2003. Contaminated Communities: Coping with Residential Toxic Exposure Westview Press.
 Folk, Ellison. "Public Participation in the Superfund Cleanup Process," Ecology Law Quarterly 18 (1991), 173–221.
 Hird, J. A. 1993. "Environmental Policy and Equity: the case of Superfund." Journal of Policy Analysis and Management 12: 323–343.
 Munday, Pat. 2002. "'A millionaire couldn't buy a piece of water as good:' George Grant and the Conservation of the Big Hole River Watershed." Montana: The Magazine of Western History 52 (2): 20–37.
 Okrusch, Chad Michael. "Pragmatism and environmental problem-solving: A systematic moral analysis of democratic decision-making in Butte, Montana" (PhD. Diss. University of Oregon, 2010) online
 Quivik, Fredric. 2004. "Of Tailings, Superfund Litigation, and Historians as Experts: U.S. v. Asarco, et al. (the Bunker Hill Case in Idaho)." The Public Historian 26 (1): 81–104.
 Probst, K. et al. 2002. "Superfund's Future: What Will It Cost?" Environmental Forum, 19 (2 ): 32–41.
 Tesh, Sylvia. 1999. "Citizen experts in environmental risk." Policy Studies 32 (1): 39–58.
 Teske, N. 2000. "A tale of two TAGs: Dialogue and democracy in the superfund program." American Behavioral Scientist. 44 (4): 664–678.

Web resources
 United States Environmental Protection Agency. 2005a. Region 8 – Superfund: Citizen's Guide to Superfund. Updated December 27, 2005. www.epa.gov/ Accessed 27Dec.05.
 __. 2005b. "EPA Region 8—Environmental Justice (EJ) Program." Updated March 24, 2005). www.epa.gov/region8/ej/ Accessed 05.Jan.06.
 __. 2004a. Superfund Cleanup Proposal, Butte Priority Soils Operable Unit of the Silver Bow Creek/Butte Area Superfund Site, epa.gov, accessed December 20, 2004.
 __. 2004b. "Clark Fork River Record of Decision," available at epa.gov
 __. 2002a. Superfund Community Involvement Toolkit. EPA 540-K-01-004.*
 __. 2002b. "Butte Benefits from a $78 Million Cleanup Agreement." Available at epa.gov
 __. 1998. Superfund Community Involvement Handbook and Toolkit. Washington, DC: Office of Emergency and Remedial Response.
 __. 1996. "EPA Superfund Record of Decision R08-96/112." Available at epa.gov
 __. 1992.  "Environmental Equity: Reducing Risk for All Communities."  EPA A230-R-92-008; two volumes (June 1992).
 Society for Applied Anthropology. 2005. "SFAA Project Townsend, Case Study Three, The Clark Fork Superfund Sites in Western Montana." sfaa.net, accessed November 23, 2005
 Montana Environmental Information Center. 2005. "Federal Superfund: EPA's Plan for Butte Priority Soils." Available at meic.org
 Murray, C. and D.R. Marmorek. 2004. "Adaptive Management: A science-based approach to managing ecosystems in the face of uncertainty." Prepared for presentation at the Fifth International Conference on Science and Management of Protected Areas: Making Ecosystem Based Management Work, Victoria, British Columbia, May 11–16, 2003. ESSA Technologies, BC, Canada.
 National Academy of Sciences. 2005. The National Academy of Sciences Report on Superfund and Mining Megasites: Lessons from the Coeur d'Alene River Basin. Available at epa.gov
 Public Employees for Environmental Responsibility. 2005. "Cut and Run: EPA Betrays Another Montana Town—A Tale of Butte, the Largest Superfund Site in the United States." News release (August 18, 2005), peer.org, accessed September 15, 2005
 Southland, Elizabeth. 2003. "Megasites: Presentation for the NACEPT—Superfund Subcommittee." www.epa.gov/oswer/docs/naceptdocs/megasites.pdf, accessed April 22, 2005.

Academic resources
 Center for Public Environmental Oversight. 2002. "Roundtable on Long-term Management in the Cleanup of Contaminated Sites." Report from a roundtable held in Washington, DC, June 28, 2002, cpeo.org,  accessed December 19, 2005.
 Case, Bridgette Dawn. "The women's protective union: Union women activists in a union town, 1890-1929" (PhD Dissertation. Montana State University-Bozeman,  2004) online
 Curran, Mary E. 1996. "The Contested Terrain of Butte, Montana: Social Landscapes of Risk and Resiliency." Master's thesis, University of Montana.
 LeCain, Timothy. 1998. "Moving Mountains: Technology and Environment in Western Copper Mining." PhD Dissertation, University of Delaware.
 Quivik, Frederic. 1998. "Smoke and Tailings: An Environmental History of Copper Smelting Technologies in Montana, 1880–1930." PhD Dissertation, University of Pennsylvania.

Other
 Mercier, Laurie. 2001. Anaconda: Labor, Community, and Culture in Montana's Smelter City (University of Illinois Press).
 
 Toole, K. Ross. 1954. "A History of the Anaconda Copper Mining Company: A Study in the Relationships between a State and its People and a Corporation, 1880–1950." PhD Dissertation, University of California-Los Angeles.

Primary sources
 Copper Camp: Stories of the world's greatest mining town, Butte, Montana compiled by Workers of the Writers' Program of the Work Projects Administration in the State of Montana.

External links

Local resources
 City and County of Butte-Silver Bow
 Butte Oral History Project (University of Montana Archives)
 Butte Visitors Bureau

Photographs and media
 Panoramic (zoomable) view of Butte, Montana, 1904, via Library of Congress 
 Hidden Fire: The Great Butte Explosion Documentary produced by Montana PBS

 
Cities in Montana
Cities in Silver Bow County, Montana
Chinese-American culture in Montana
Irish-American neighborhoods
County seats in Montana
Census balances in the United States
Mining communities in Montana
Consolidated city-counties